Podkraj is a settlement in the Municipality of Žalec in east-central Slovenia. It lies in the eastern part of the Ložnica Hills north of Žalec. The area is part of the traditional region of Styria. The municipality is now included in the Savinja Statistical Region.

References

External links
Podkraj at Geopedia

Populated places in the Municipality of Žalec